Justin Lefkovitch  (born August 29, 1987) is an American  entrepreneur.   He is the founder and CEO of Mirrored Media, an experiential marketing firm.

Early life and education
Lefkovitch grew up in Westlake Village, California.  He attended Pepperdine University, where as a student he began working with singer/songwriter Ray Kennedy. As Kennedy's manager, he discovered the “deficiencies and frustrations that artists endured,” and began to research ways to create additional revenue sources and increase audience size, ultimately focusing on brand partnerships. As his ideas took shape, Lefkovitch wrote a business plan for Pepperdine's business plan competition. It emphasized the merger of music and digital media and the power of experience-based marketing as a strategy to engage millennials.  Lefkovitch graduated from Pepperdine with a bachelor's degree in business in 2009.

Career 
In 2010, based on the ideas he first developed for the Pepperdine competition, Lefkovitch founded Mirrored Media.  Composers and entrepreneurs Steve Kofsky and Hans Zimmer were his initial strategic partners. In 2011, Lefkovitch met angel investor Vaden Saunders, who subsequently invested $500,000 in Mirrored Media.  The company has since created experiential campaigns for clients including Google Play, Acura, TuneCore, Syfy, Crave Online, and 20th Century Fox.  Mirrored Media was included on the Event Marketer 2015 "It List" of Top 100 Event Agencies.

Lefkovitch appeared on the 2013 Los Angeles Business Journal “20 in their 20s” list.  In 2015, he was included in a New York Times style article on hair trends.

Lefkovitch is named one of Cablefax's Overachievers under 30.

Personal life
Lefkovitch attended the Academy of Magical Arts at 13 and later became a performing member of the Magic Castle.  He has raised money for several charities through fundraising appearances as a magician, and was honored by Power 30 Under 30 for "giving back to the community to help those in need."

References

External links
 Media

1987 births
Living people
American business executives